Santhal is a town and former Seventh Class princely state in Gujarat, western India.

History 
The non-jurisdictional (e)state in Mahi Kantha, including two more villages, was part of Katosan thana and had no separate Chief but was ruled by the Kshatriya Koli shareholder Chieftains of Katosan State, in whose state revenue it was included.
 
In 1901 it has a population of 3,3356, paying a separate 1,774 Rupees tribute to the Gaekwar Baroda State.

External links and Sources 

 Imperial Gazetteer on dsal.uchicago.edu - Mahi Kantha

References

Princely states of Gujarat
Koli princely states